Pekka Antero Pesola (February 27, 1925 – March 28, 2009) was a Finnish lawyer, civil servant, bank director and politician born in Soini. He began his political career in the Liberal League and was a member of the Parliament of Finland from 1966 to 1970, representing the Liberal People's Party (LKP).

Pesola was the banking manager at Kansallis-Osake-Pankki.

References

1925 births
2009 deaths
People from Soini
Liberal League (Finland) politicians
Liberals (Finland) politicians
Members of the Parliament of Finland (1966–70)
Finnish military personnel of World War II
Finnish bankers